"Gold" is a song written and recorded by John Stewart in 1979. It was the lead single and biggest hit among three Top 40 singles released from his LP, Bombs Away Dream Babies. The song was Stewart's first US Top 40 hit, as well as his first chart single in a decade (since "Armstrong" peaked at #74 in 1969). Stevie Nicks from Fleetwood Mac is featured on backing vocals.

"Gold" became a top-five hit in the United States, Canada and Australia. It also charted in the UK and New Zealand although not as high.

A music video was released featuring Stewart performing the song in front of a band. Despite Stevie Nicks providing backing vocals, she does not appear in the video.

Background
Stewart wrote the song some time after he left the folk group Kingston Trio. The song is from the album Bombs Away Dream Babies, in which Nicks and Lindsey Buckingham contributed. (Although the guitar solo in "Gold" is similar in style to Buckingham's, it was actually played by Stewart.)  The song has a smooth funk/pop rhythm.

The song takes a light-hearted but cynical view of the recording industry in Los Angeles; in time, Stewart would feel the same way about the song itself. He would eventually stop performing "Gold" in concert, calling it "vapid" and "empty" and meaning nothing to him, having done it for the money and to please his record company.

Chart history

Weekly charts

Year-end charts

See also
 List of 1970s one-hit wonders in the United States

References

External links
Lyrics of this song

1979 singles
RSO Records singles
1979 songs
Songs about music
Songs about Los Angeles
Songs written by John Stewart (musician)